Son Fuster Vell is a station of the Palma Metro in Palma on the island of Majorca, Spain.

The underground station, which opened 25 April 2007, is located beside Camí Vell de Bunyola.

References

Palma Metro stations
Railway stations in Spain opened in 2007